The 2009 Tour du Haut Var was the 41st edition of the Tour du Haut Var cycle race and was held on 21–22 February 2009. The race started in Saint-Raphaël and finished in Callian. The race was won by Thomas Voeckler.

General classification

References

2009
2009 in road cycling
2009 in French sport